Charles McGuigan (13 December 1900 – March 1949) was an English professional footballer who played in the Football League for Brentford and Barrow as an outside forward.

Career statistics

References

1900 births
1949 deaths
Footballers from County Durham
English footballers
Association football outside forwards
Houghton Rovers F.C. players
Newcastle United F.C. players
Brentford F.C. players
Wheatley Hill Colliery F.C. players
Weymouth F.C. players
Barrow A.F.C. players
Sheppey United F.C. players
Peterborough & Fletton United F.C. players
Darlington Town F.C. players
Thornley Colliery Welfare F.C. players
English Football League players
Western Football League players
Southern Football League players